This is a List of World Championships medalists in men's weightlifting.

Flyweight
 52 kg: 1969–1991
 54 kg: 1993–1997
 55 kg: 2018–

Bantamweight
 56 kg: 1947–1991
 59 kg: 1993–1997
 56 kg: 1998–2017
 61 kg: 2018–

Featherweight
 60 kg: 1906–1991
 64 kg: 1993–1997
 62 kg: 1998–2017
 67 kg: 2018–

Lightweight
 67.5 kg: 1905
 70 kg: 1906–1913
 67.5 kg: 1920–1991
 70 kg: 1993–1997
 69 kg: 1998–2017
 73 kg: 2018–

Middleweight
 80 kg: 1905–1913
 75 kg: 1920–1991
 76 kg: 1993–1997
 77 kg: 1998–2017
 81 kg: 2018–

Light heavyweight
 82.5 kg: 1920–1991
 83 kg: 1993–1997
 85 kg: 1998–2017
 89 kg: 2018–

Middle heavyweight
 90 kg: 1951–1991
 91 kg: 1993–1997
 94 kg: 1998–2017
 96 kg: 2018–

First heavyweight
 100 kg: 1977–1991
 99 kg: 1993–1997
 102 kg: 2018–

Heavyweight
 Open: 1891–1904
 +80 kg: 1905–1913
 +82.5 kg: 1920–1950
 +90 kg: 1951–1968
 110 kg: 1969–1991
 108 kg: 1993–1997
 105 kg: 1998–2017
 109 kg: 2018–

Super heavyweight
 +110 kg: 1969–1991
 +108 kg: 1993–1997
 +105 kg: 1998–2017
 +109 kg: 2018–

Medal table

 Names in italic are national entities that no longer exist.

See also
List of Olympic medalists in weightlifting

References
Weightlifting World Championships Seniors Statistics 
IWF Results
2008.sohu.com

External links
Database IWRP

Medalists
World Championships men
World Championships men
Weightlifting